Carole Demas (born May 26, 1940, in Brooklyn, New York) is an American actress and singer, best known for originating the roles of Sandy in the 1971 Broadway musical Grease and the title role in the original 1976 production of The Baker's Wife, for many prime time television roles, hundreds of commercials, and for her role in the long-running children's television show The Magic Garden.  The winding path of Carole's career, highlighted in Schirmer, Citadel and Applause Books chronicling the trials and triumphs of Broadway, has taken her from her early days as Miss Vermont in The Miss Universe Contest, to major roles from coast to coast. Her cabaret and concert performances have brought funds and attention to many worthy causes.

Biography
Demas was born in Brooklyn, New York in 1940. She attended Midwood High School in Brooklyn. She holds a B.A. in English from the University of Vermont and continued her studies at the New York University Graduate School of Education. She spent several years as a teacher in the New York City Board of Education system including a sentimental semester teaching at P.S. 198 in Brooklyn, which she had attended from grade 5 through her graduation as the smallest kid in the eighth grade.

She made her theatrical debut with the Champlain Shakespeare Festival. Later, she was featured for four seasons with the New York Shakespeare Festival Elizabethan Singers as one of a quartet consisting of Paula Janis (her eventual co-star on The Magic Garden) and their brothers, Jonathan Rosen and Alex Demas.  During her appearances she was "discovered" by theatrical agents, which lead to her ingenue lead in Fred Ebb's new book musical Morning Sun, and her continued career on stage, television and film.  While in attendance at the University of Vermont she competed to become Miss Vermont in the Miss Universe pageant.

Off-Broadway, Carole sang the ingenue lead in Fred Ebb's Morning Sun (with Patricia Neway and Bert Convy).  She was also seen Off-Broadway in Rondelay and starred in How to Steal an Election and as “The Girl” in The Fantasticks at the Sullivan Street Playhouse.  Carole's association with Tom Jones and Harvey Schmidt, creators of The Fantasticks (the longest running Off-Broadway show in theatre history),  led to her participation in the workshop “Portfolio”.  As an active member of “Portfolio”, she was seen off-off-Broadway as the original female lead in Philemon.

On Broadway, Carole played in A Race of Hairy Men and Grease (Broadway's second longest running musical) in which she was critically acclaimed for her creation of the female lead, “Sandy”.
 
Her credits in Stock and Regional Theatre include major roles in Barefoot in the Park (with Joan Bennet), Enter Laughing, Absence of a Cello (as Hans Conried's daughter), A Funny Thing Happened on the Way to the Forum as “Philia”, Oh, What a Lovely War and her favorites, Another Part of the Forest as “Regina” at the Pennsylvania State Repertory Theatre, and Celebration at A.C.T. in Seattle as “Angel."  In New York and Los Angeles, Carole has also been seen in her Cabaret Act, which is an ongoing project.

She was delighted to be one of the many stars assembled by Lorimar Productions for their taping of  “The Best Of Broadway”—in which memorable moments from Broadway musicals were recreated by the original stars as part of the PBS series Great Performances.

Carole has guest-starred on many TV shows, among them Barnaby Jones, Kojak, Mannix, Fantastic Journey, The Man from Atlantis, and The Edge of Night; playing everything from victims to girlfriends to murderers.  Recently she played the recurring role of Hannah Lafferty on As the World Turns.

Carole Demas and co-star Paula Janis, starred in the immensely popular and highly acclaimed children's TV program The Magic Garden, which was seen on WPIX-TV for over 12 years.  During this time Carole and Paula formed CAP Productions, Inc., and produced and marketed 3 records for children, selling over 100,000 copies to date.  They wrote and starred in over 100 "Live" SRO appearances, bringing music and fun to thousands of children and their families at their many performances at Town Hall, Symphony Space, The Shubert Theatre (New Haven), The Shakespeare Theatre (Stratford, Connecticut), The Papermill Playhouse, The McCarter Theatre, The Bardavon Playhouse, Colden Center, The Walt Whitman Theatre  and at various fund-raising events.

	In addition to the three children's albums already completed (“Paula and Carole in the Magic Garden”, “Tales from the Storybox” and “Musical Goose on the Loose”), CAP Productions will release “Cottonmill Girls”, a collection of folk songs of the American textile mills, arranged and performed by Alex Demas.  Also in the works is “Tales from the Storybox, Volume 2” a sequel to the already successful Volume I.  Under their CAP Productions banner, Carole and her partner wrote, produced and starred in “A Magic Garden Christmas”, a one-hour television special.  This program received a local Emmy nomination and will soon be available on home video.

Carole's wonderful versatility been seen and heard in over 200 commercials for television promoting everything from:  Peanut Butter  to  Tires and a few times singing the jingle on camera for the commercial.

She has continued performing in concert and Cabaret all over the world, headlining on Crystal Cruise to French Polynesia, In Barbados for 2 years, on St. Croix for 2 benefit concerts.  She has done numerous benefit/fundraising concerts in New York for worthwhile causes.  She has performed at most of the major Cabaret spaces including Feinstein's 54 Below, The Laurie Beechman Theatre, Don't Tell Mama, Urban Stages, etc.

In 2017 she set out with fellow Broadway star Sarah Rice (Sweeney Todd) to create a show honoring Tom Jones and Harvey Schmidt.  The show titled Thank You For Your Love, premiered at the Laurie Beechman Theatre the following year and received a prestigious Bistro Award.  In 2019 the show was expanded to 2 full acts and premiered on Long Island at the John Engeman Theatre.  Plans were afoot to tour this show, when Covid put a temporary end to that idea.

In 2020 she began a monthly Live stream concert series - Live from Skylight Run, which continues to this day.

Carole is married to Sound Designer/Recording Engineer/Producer, Stuart J. Allyn.  They live in Westchester with 1 cat rescued from the woods, and their turtle, "Tompson."  Carole continues to work as an actress and singer and is pursuing more projects as a singer, writer and producer.

Career

Theater
Demas' theater career began in 1963 as the ingenue lead (opposite Bert Convy and starring Patricia Neway) role in Morning Sun, an early Fred Ebb effort (before his partnership with John Kander). She was next cast in a Starring role Off-Broadway in Rondelay and then in How To Steal An Election opposite Clifton Davis. She was later cast as a replacement for the role of "Louisa (The Girl)" in The Fantasticks, and starred in that role for more than 2 years. Her work with Tom Jones and Harvey Schmidt continued with the Portfolio workshop and her starring in their productions of Philemon and The Bone Room. In 1971, Demas was cast in the title role of the revival of No, No, Nanette, but was dismissed from the cast during rehearsals, owing to a disagreement between the director and the casting director.

Demas was next cast as "Sandy" in the original Broadway production of Grease. At age 31, she was the oldest member of the principal cast. She worked with writers Jim Jacobs and Warren Casey to develop the role, which, in the original Chicago play (Grease Lightning) on which the musical was based, was considered too dark for the mainstream Broadway audience. For her role in Grease, Demas, along with the rest of the original Broadway cast, was inducted into the Rock and Roll Hall of Fame.

Demas left Grease to join the cast of a new musical, The Baker's Wife, produced by David Merrick. The play, which was being produced in Los Angeles in preparation for a national tour prior to a Broadway opening, proved problematic from the start, and several efforts were made to fix it, including replacing Demas with Patti LuPone, but to no avail. The Baker's Wife never came to Broadway.

Her regional theatre credits include major roles in Barefoot in the Park (with Joan Bennet), Enter Laughing, Absence of a Cello (as Hans Conried's daughter), A Funny Thing Happened on the Way to the Forum as “Philia”,  Oh, What a Lovely War, and her favorites, “Regina” in Another Part of the Forest at the Pennsylvania State Repertory Theatre, and “Angel” in Celebration at ACT in Seattle.

In 2011, at The New Amsterdam Theatre for Gypsy of the Year, Carole re-united with several original Grease cast members for a special performance.

Television and film
While working in Grease, Demas and long-time friend Paula Janis began starring in the television show The Magic Garden for WPIX-TV in New York City. She and Janis continued presenting this daily children's television show from 1972 until 1984, with live concerts continuing long after the television show stopped being broadcast.  They also co-wrote and appeared in two 1-hour specials, A Magic Garden Christmas, and The Magic Garden——Still Growing.  WPIX-TV has continued to feature them in news stories and on the web with Magic Garden Moments.

For the popular PBS Series Great Performances, Carole joined other stars of the Great White Way for Lorimar's  Showstoppers—The Best of Broadway, in which memorable moments from Broadway musicals were recreated by the original stars.  Demas has also appeared as a guest actor on many daytime and primetime series, including One Life to Live, The Edge of Night, Barnaby Jones, Mannix, Kojak, N.Y.P.D., The Man from Atlantis, and more recently Blue Bloods and Allegiance.

Carole was featured in the films, The 300 Year Weekend ( with William DeVane), and her other films include The Space Works for Trans-Lux Corp. and A Lovely Way to Die for Universal Films.

Concerts and cabaret
Demas has turned to concerts and cabaret in her later life. She has produced her one-woman show Summer Nights at the Laurie Beechman Theatre, and appears often in Broadway reviews, retrospectives, and fundraiser concerts:
 Town Hall’s Broadway Originals concert, Town Hall, NYC — featured
 Off-Broadway Close Up, Merkin Concert Hall, NYC
 50th Anniversary concerts for WBAI Radio, The Fantasticks (Night of 1000 Luisas) and The Lincoln Center Library For The Performing Arts
 Gypsy of the Year at the New Amsterdam Theater, NYC
 Afternoon of Broadway Stars, Crystal Cruise Symphony, Galaxy Theatre, French Polynesia
 Steve Ross' Broadway, Ziegfeld Society, Lang Hall, NYC
 Broadway by the Year 1972 at Town Hall, NYC
 Carole Demas and Friends benefit for the Westchester Land Trust, Westchester Broadway Theatre, Elmsford, NY
 Broadway on St. Croix, The Reef Pavilion, St. Croix, U.S.Virgin Islands
 Broadway Returns to Barbados, Frank Colymore Hall, Bridgetown, Barbados
 One Enchanted Evening, The Caribbean Theatre, Christiansted, St. Croix, U.S.Virgin Islands
 Winter Rhythms, Urban Stages, NYC
 Concerts for City Greens, Tudor City, NY
 Actor's Fund, Broadway Cares benefit at Signature Theatre, NYC
 benefit concert for the Irvington Town Hall Theatre, Irvington, New York
 Primary Stages annual gala
 Benefit concert for Zani's Furry Friends, Birdland, New York City
 Huntington's disease benefit concert, NYIT Auditorium
 "Broadway Ballyhoo" at 54 Below, New York City
 Sondheim Unplugged - 54 Below, New York City
 Broadway Concerts Direct - Blooming Grove Series
 Broadway Originals - 54 Below, New York City
 Thank You For Your Love - Laurie Beechman Theater, New York City - Bistro Award Winner, 2x Mac Nominee

Roles

Recordings
Grease - Original Broadway Cast Album (1972)
How to Steal an Election - Original Off-Broadway Cast Album
Carole and Paula in the Magic Garden - Original Cast Album
Carole and Paula: Tales from the Storybox
Carole and Paula: Musical Goose on the Loose
Green Songs - Champlain Shakespeare Minstrels
Festival Line Singers In Concert - New York Shakespeare Festival Line Singers
Hidden Treasures-Jones and Schmidt - 2018

Miscellaneous
Demas was inducted into the Long Island Music Hall of Fame in 2010
Demas serves on the advisory board of The New York Children's Theatre Festival

Personal life
Demas presently resides in Westchester County, New York with her husband, Stuart Allyn.

References

External links
 
Carole and Paula - Friends Forever - The Magic Garden

 (archive)

Living people
People from Brooklyn
American stage actresses
1940 births
American children's television presenters
Actresses from New York City
University of Vermont alumni
New York University alumni
21st-century American women